Panther Creek is a stream in Lafayette and Pettis Counties in the U.S. state of Missouri. It is a tributary of the Blackwater River.

Panther Creek was named for the panthers which once roamed there.

See also
List of rivers of Missouri

References

Rivers of Lafayette County, Missouri
Rivers of Pettis County, Missouri
Rivers of Missouri